Bigg Boss Ultimate was the first season of the Tamil Indian reality Streaming television of Bigg Boss Ultimate, the spin-off to Bigg Boss Tamil and the first series to be released exclusively on Star India streaming service Disney+ Hotstar. The season launched on 30 January 2022 with Kamal Haasan as a host, but he has exited the show from week 3 onwards, due to scheduling conflicts with his upcoming film Vikram. Later, Silambarasan continued as a host from week 4 onwards.

The Grand Finale of the show took place on 10 April 2022 and Balaji Murugadoss emerged as the winner, while Niroop Nandakumar became the runner-up.

Thamarai Selvi and Maria Juliana became the first 2 commoner contestants to make it to the grand finale and becoming finalists in the whole Bigg Boss Tamil franchise.

This version of Bigg Boss was somewhat successful for the Bigg Boss Tamil franchise and topped trp charts with a high of 6.12 trp on the grand finale night which is impressive for an OTT platform. However it still remains a underrated season in the franchise.

This version of Bigg Boss only lasted for 70 days (10 weeks) making it the shortest season of the Bigg Boss Tamil franchise.

Production

Teaser During the finale of Bigg Boss Tamil 5, Kamal Haasan and Sivakarthikeyan unveiled the eye logo for the brand new Digital edition of Bigg Boss Tamil titled as Bigg Boss Ultimate. The teaser of the show released on 17 January 2022, on Disney+ Hotstar.

BroadcastApart from the usual hour-long episode, viewers will also have access to the direct 24x7 camera footage. The show will be telecasted 7 days a week  (Monday to Sunday). The episodes will be first telecasted through 24 Hours Live Channel on the paid subscription of Disney+ Hotstar. This version of Bigg Boss Tamil will not be aired on Star Vijay like the main series seasons. Disney+ Hotstar will be streaming a deferred 24/7 live stream with a 24-hour delay.

HouseThe house for the season is the same design that was used for the fifth season with only minor changes to furniture. Only an additional luxurious private room was added for the Trending Player.

Change of hostSince actor Kamal Haasan was busy with his film's shooting Vikram he stepped down as host at the end of the third week of the show. Actor Simbu was replaced as the host from Week 4 onwards.

Extension of the showThe makers of the ultimate version decided to extend the show for extra two weeks originally the show only contained 8 weeks, however, later being extended to 10 weeks.

Concept
Former contestantsContestants from the previous seasons of the main Bigg Boss Tamil series would participate as contestants yet again in the first season of the Bigg Boss Ultimate digital version. Contestants from the 1st till the 5th season are allowed to participate except the winners in all the season won't be able to participate in this version. However, some new contestants who never participated in the series at all can only join the show as wildcard contestants.

FeaturesViewers of the show will get the chance to see live nominations, luxury budget tasks, punishments, and evictions every week.

Twist In Finale Week
This version of Bigg Boss contained six finalists. However, every day leading up to the Grand Finale which is known as the Pre finale, each finalist will be sent out of the finale race based on their live voting position. Only the top four finalists who have the highest votes will last till the Grand Finale on the 70th day. While the remaining two finalist out of the six will be sent out only few days before the grand finale which is known as the pre finale days.

Housemates Status

 indicates Season 1 contestant indicates Season 2 contestant indicates Season 3 contestant indicates Season 4 contestant indicates Season 5 contestant indicates new contestant

Most Nominated in Eviction

Housemates with Status improvements
These following housemates have received a improvement in their status and overall positions in this version of Bigg Boss compared to when they played in they're previous seasons.

Overall Previous Season Status

Housemates
Following are the housemates taking part in Bigg Boss Ultimate Season 1, including the regular Bigg Boss Tamil season they had earlier taken part in and where they finished in that season, in order of entry to the Bigg Boss Ultimate house:

 Vanitha Vijayakumar (Season 3): An actress known for playing the lead role in the film Chandralekha (1995). She won the inaugural season of Cooku with Comali. She is the daughter of actors Vijayakumar and Manjula Vijayakumar. She was evicted twice during the third season of Bigg Boss Tamil, first on Day 21, and then again on Day 84 after re-entering the house as a wildcard contestant on Day 50.
 Niroop Nandakumar (Season 5): A model. He was the fourth runner-up of the fifth season of Bigg Boss Tamil.
 Maria Juliana "Julie" (Season 1): An actress, model, and former nurse who shot to fame during the 2017 pro-jallikattu protests and is known for her role in the film Naan Sirithal (2020). She was evicted on Day 42 during the first season of Bigg Boss Tamil.
 Abhirami Venkatachalam (Season 3): A model, actress and Bharatanatyam dancer known for her role in the film Nerkonda Paarvai (2019) starring Ajith Kumar. She was evicted on Day 56 during the third season of Bigg Boss Tamil.
 Thamarai Selvi (Season 5): A stage drama artiste. She was evicted on Day 98 during the fifth season of Bigg Boss Tamil.
 Thaadi Bhalaji (Season 2): An actor who has worked as a comedian in many Tamil films. He has also appeared as a judge in various Tamil comedy shows. He was evicted on Day 98 during the second season of Bigg Boss Tamil.
 Balaji Murugadoss "Bala" (Season 4): A fitness model and entrepreneur who won the beauty pageant Mister India International 2019. He was the first runner-up of the fourth season of Bigg Boss Tamil.
 Anitha Sampath (Season 4): A newsreader, television anchor, and actress who is known for her work in Sun TV's News  She has appeared in films such as Kaappaan (2019) and Master (2021). She won the dance reality show Bigg Boss Jodigal with Shariq Hassan Khan as her partner. She was evicted on Day 84 during the fourth season of Bigg Boss Tamil.
 Suja Varunee (Season 1): An actress and dancer who has appeared in supporting roles in the films Milaga (2010), Pencil (2016) and Aan Devathai (2018). She appeared in the first season of Bigg Boss Tamil as a wildcard contestant, entered the house on Day 52, and was evicted on Day 91.
 Suresh Chakravarthi (Season 4): An actor, former television host and producer and entrepreneur, known for Sun TV programs such as Chinna Papa Periya Papa and Pepsi Ungal Choice, for which he was the director. He was evicted on Day 35 during the fourth season of Bigg Boss Tamil.
 Shariq Hassan Khan (Season 2): An actor, model, and dancer known for playing the antagonist in the film Pencil (2016). He won the dance reality show Bigg Boss Jodigal with Anitha Sampath as his partner. He is the son of actors Riyaz Khan and Uma Riyaz Khan and the grandson of actress Kamala Kamesh. He was evicted on Day 49 during the second season of Bigg Boss Tamil.
 Abhinay Vaddi (Season 5): An actor known for playing the lead role in the film Ramanujan (2014) as well as his role in the film Chennai 600028 II (2016). He is the grandson of the legendary Tamil film stars Gemini Ganesan and Savitri. He was evicted on Day 77 during the fifth season of Bigg Boss Tamil.
 Suruthi Periyasamy (Season 5): A runway model and a sportsperson. She was evicted on Day 35 during the fifth season of Bigg Boss Tamil.
 Snehan (Season 1): A lyricist, poet, actor, motivational speaker, and politician who has written lyrics for many Tamil film songs. He was the first runner-up of the first season of Bigg Boss Tamil.

Wildcard contestants
Sathish Kumar (new contestant): An actor and comedian known for his appearance in the television comedy show Kalakka Povathu Yaaru and for his role in the film Pattas (2020). He is a new contestant.
Ramya Pandian (Season 4): an actress, known for acting in films such as Aan Devathai (2018), and Joker (2016). She was the third runner-up of the fourth season of Bigg Boss Tamil.

Bigg Boss Ultimate Prison
Each week contestants who break the rules of the house will be sent to the underground ultimate prison.

 Male

 Female

Trending Player
Each week the audience gets to vote for the housemate who caught the eye of the audience and gave a huge chunk of content that week. And the housemate who receives this title will be exempt from that week's nomination process.

Cash Reward and Bomb
Each week the evicted contestant of the week has the option to give one of the competing housemates a cash reward using "Bigg Boss Ultimate money" and another housemate a bomb punishment which they will be punished for the whole week. However, both rewards and punishments can also be awarded to a single housemate.

Weekly Summary
{| class="wikitable" style="width:100%; font-size:90%; line-height:20px"
! rowspan="12" style="background:#FAFAD2;"| Week 1
|Entrances
|None
|-
|Twist||Ultimate Season held nominations for the first week of Bigg Boss which was unusual in the Bigg Boss Tamil Franchise.
|-
|Nominations||Vanitha Vijayakumar, Suresh Chakravarthi, Maria Juliana, Abhinay Vaddi, Anitha Sampath, Snehan, Suruthi Periyasamy and Niroop Nandhakumar were nominated for the Week 1 Elimination Process.
|-
|Tasks||
 Captaincy task: noneTeam A was selected as the best team.Anitha Sampath was awarded as the Best Reporter.Abhirami Venkatachalam was awarded as the Best Star Celebrity.
|-
|House Captain||style="background:#cfc;" | Shariq Hassan Khan was the Captain of the Bigg Boss Ultimate House for Week 1 and thus, exempted from the nomination process.
|-
|Prison||Suja Varunee and Balaji Murugadoss were sent to the prison on the Launch Day by Bigg Boss due to rule break.
|-
| rowspan="2" |CaptaincyResults|  style="text-align:center; background:#9F6;"| Winner (Captaincy Task) – Shariq|-
| style="text-align:center; background:red;"| Failed (Captaincy Task) – All other housemates|-
|Notes||---Nil---
|-
|Report Card ||Abhinay received 7/10 Abhirami received 7/10 Anitha received 7/10 Balaji M received 8/10 Balaji T received 8/10 Juliana received 6/10 Niroop received 8/10 Suja received 6/10 Snehan received 7/10 Suresh received 7/10 Suruthi received 6/10 Thamarai received 8/10 Vanitha received 7/10 Shariq was exempt from the report card since he was the house captain.
|-
|Saved contestants||Niroop, Anitha, Snehan, Suruthi, Juliana, Abhinay and Vanitha received enough public votes to stay in the Bigg Boss Ultimate house.
|-
|Exits||style="background:salmon;" |Suresh Chakravarthi was evicted from the Bigg Boss House on Day 7 after receiving the fewest votes.
 
|-
! colspan="3" |
|-
! rowspan="12" style="background:#EEE8AA;" | Week 2
|Nominations||Abhinay Vaddi, Balaji Murugadoss, Thaadi Balaji, Maria Juliana, Suja Varunee and Thamarai Selvi were nominated for the Week 2 Elimination Process.
|-
| Task||Police vs Thief's, all the housemates are split into 2 different teams one being the police team and the other being the thief teams. The task lasted from day 9 till day 11. However, after 1 day the groups will exchange roles in the task.
 Original Teams

 However the teams exchanged to the opposite roles after a day.
|-
|House Captain||style="background:#cfc;" |Snehan Sivaselvam was the Captain of the Bigg Boss Ultimate House for Week 2 and thus, exempted from the nomination process. However, Snehan's captaincy was given to him by Suresh Chakravarthi who was stripped from the captaincy after getting evicted in week 1.
|-
|Prison
|Anitha Sampath, Thamarai Selvi and Maria Juliana were sent to the prison on  Day 8 by Bigg Boss due to rule break.
Balaji Murugadoss was sent to the prison on  Day 9 by Bigg Boss due to a rule break during the BB Police Station task.
|-
|Punishments||All the housemates who were thieves during the  Police vs Thief's task were able to be sent to the prison anytime by the police.
|-
| Trending Player||Vanitha Vijayakumar was selected as the of the week and was exempt from the Week 2 nomination process.
|-
| rowspan="3" |Results
|  style="text-align:center; background:#9F6;"| Winner (Captaincy Task) – Snehan
|-
| style="text-align:center; background:red;"| Failed (Captaincy Task) – Abhirami, Anitha and Balaji M
|-
| style="text-align:center; background:#58FAAC;"| Stripped (Captaincy Task) – Suresh (Evicted)
|-
|Report Card ||
Abhinay received 9/10 
Abhirami received 9/10 
Anitha received 9/10 
Balaji M received 9/10 
Balaji T received 9/10 
Juliana received 8/10 
Niroop received 9/10 
Suja received 9/10 
Shariq received 9/10  
Suruthi received 9/10 
Thamarai received 9/10 
Vanitha received 8/10 
Snehan was exempt from the report card since he was the house captain.
|-
|Saved contestants||
Balaji M, Balaji T, Thamarai Selvi, Juliana, and Abhinay Vaadi received enough public votes to stay in the Bigg Boss Ultimate house.
|-
|Exits||style="background:salmon;" |Suja Varunee was evicted from the Bigg Boss House on Day 14 after receiving the fewest votes.
|-
! colspan=3|
|-
! rowspan="12" style="background:#F0E68C;" | Week 3
|Nominations||Abhinay Vaadi, Balaji Murugadoss, Anitha Sampath, Maria Juliana, Niroop Nandakumar, Shariq Hassan Khan, Snehan and Thamarai Selvi were nominated for the Week 3 Elimination Process.
|-
|Valentines Day task||All the housemates will be divided into duos with another housemate. Each duo will be given a heart-shaped balloon for them, however, they should not let the balloons be dropped, burst, or let out into the air. The last duo with the balloon wins the task.

 Juliana and Abhirami won the task.
|-
|Tasks||Back to the 80's, all the housemates need to dress up like a person from the 1980s and need to do various tasks featuring the 80's theme. If all the housemates complete the tasks successfully they will receive luxury budget points. 
|-
| rowspan="3" |Results
|  style="text-align:center; background:#9F6;"| Winner (Captaincy Task) – Vanitha
|-
| style="text-align:center; background:red;"| Failed (Captaincy Task) – Suruthi and Niroop
|-
| style="text-align:center; background:#58FAAC;"| Stripped (Captaincy Task) – Suja (Evicted)
|-
|House Captain||style="background:#cfc;" |Vanitha Vijayakumar was the Captain of the Bigg Boss Ultimate House for Week 3 and thus, exempted from the nomination process. However, Vanitha's captaincy was given after she won a captaincy task after the eviction of the former house captain Suja Varunee who was stripped from the position after being evicted.
|-
| Report Card ||
Abhinay received 7/10 
Abhirami received 6/10 
Anitha received 8/10 
Balaji M received 6/10 
Balaji T received 8/10 
Juliana received 7/10 
Niroop received 6/10 
Shariq received 7/10 
Snehan received 6/10   
Suruthi received 8/10 
Thamarai received 8/10 
Vanitha was exempt from the report card since she was the house captain.
|-
|Punishments||Since all the housemates didn't play the luxury budget task properly, Bigg Boss announced that 2 contestants will be evicted based on public voting that week.
|-
|Prison||Niroop Nandhakumar, Thamarai Selvi and Suruthi Periyasamy were sent to the prison on O'Day 19 after being voted as the worst performers of the week by co housemates.
|-
|Saved contestants||
Balaji M, Thamarai Selvi, Juliana, Anitha Sampath, Niroop Nandhakumar and Snehan received enough public votes to stay in the Bigg Boss Ultimate house.
|-
|Exits||style="background:salmon;" |DOUBLE EVICTIONAbhinay Vaddi and Shariq Hassan Khan was evicted from the Bigg Boss House on Day 21 after receiving the fewest votes.
|-
! colspan=3|
|-
! rowspan="10" style="background:#DAA520;" | Week 4
|Entrances
|Sathish Kumar entered the Bigg Boss Ultimate House on Day 28 as a wildcard contestant.
Suresh Chakravarthi re entered the Bigg Boss Ultimate House on Day 28 as a wildcard contestant.
|-
|Nominations||Abhirami Venkatachalam, Anitha Sampath, Maria Juliana, Niroop Nandakumar, Suruthi Periyasamy, Snehan, Thaadi Bhalaji and Vanitha Vijayakumar were nominated for the Week 4 Elimination Process.
|-
|Tasks|| Devil vs Angel All housemates will be divided into 2 separate groups, one being the devil and the other being the angel.

|-
| Trending Player||Balaji M was selected as the of the week and was exempt from the Week 4 nomination process.
|-
|House Captain||style="background:#cfc;" |Thamarai Selvi was the Captain of the Bigg Boss Ultimate House for Week 4 and thus, exempted from the nomination process. 
|-
| rowspan="2" |Results
|  style="text-align:center; background:#9F6;"| Winner (Captaincy Task) – Thamarai
|-
| style="text-align:center; background:red;"| Failed (Captaincy Task) – All housemates
|-
| Report Card ||
Abhirami received 7/10 
Anitha received 4/10 
Balaji M received 7/10 
Balaji T received 8/10 
Juliana received 8/10 
Niroop received 6/10 
Snehan received 6/10   
Suruthi received 7/10 
Thamarai was exempt from the report card since she was the house captain.
|-
|Walked||style="background:#fcf;" |Vanitha Vijayakumar walked out of the Bigg Boss house on Day 24.
|-
|Exits
|style="background:grey;" |NO EVICTION

Eviction of Week 4 in the Bigg Boss Ultimate House was cancelled as contestant Vanitha Vijayakumar walked out.
|-
! colspan=3|
|-
! rowspan="9" style="background:#D4AF37;" | Week 5
|-
|Nominations||Abhirami Venkatachalam, Anitha Sampath, Maria Juliana, Snehan, Suruthi Periyasamy, Thaadi Bhalaji and Thamarai Selvi were nominated for the Week 5 Elimination Process.
|-
|Twists ||
|-
|Tasks||
|-
|House Captain||style="background:#cfc;" |Balaji Murugadoss was the Captain of the Bigg Boss Ultimate House for Week 5 and thus, exempted from the nomination process. 
|-
| rowspan="2" |Results
|  style="text-align:center; background:#9F6;"| Winner (Captaincy Task) – Balaji M
|-
| style="text-align:center; background:red;"| Failed (Captaincy Task) – Thamarai, Snehan, Abhirami and Juliana
|-
| Report Card ||
|-
|Exits||
|-
! colspan=3|
|-
! rowspan="8" style="background:#CFB53B;"| Week 6
|Nominations||
|-
|Twists ||
|-
|Tasks||
|-
| rowspan="3" |Results
|  
|-
|  
|-
| 
|-
| Report Card ||
|-
|Exits||
|-
! colspan=3|
|-
! rowspan="8" style="background: #f7e98e;"| Week 7
|Nominations||
|-
|Twists ||
|-
|Tasks||
|-
| rowspan="3" |Results
|  
|-
|  
|-
| 
|-
| Report Card ||
|-
|Exits||
|-
! colspan=3|
|-
! rowspan="8" style="background: #f7e98e;"| Week 8
|Nominations||
|-
|Twists ||
|-
|Tasks||
|-
| rowspan="3" |Results
|  
|-
|  
|-
| 
|-
| Report Card ||
|-
|Exits||
|-
! colspan=3|
|-
! rowspan="8" style="background: #f7e98e;"| Week 9
|Nominations||
|-
|Twists ||
|-
|Tasks||
|-
| rowspan="3" |Results
|  
|-
|  
|-
| 
|-
| Report Card ||
|-
|Exits||
|-
! colspan=3|
|-
! rowspan="5" style="background:gold;"| Week 10Finale Week
|Nominations|| 
|-
|Exits ||
|-
|Happenings||
|-
| Report Card ||
|-
|Twists ||
|-
! colspan=3|
|-
| colspan="3" style="background:gold; text-align:center"|Day 70Grand Finale|}

Nominations Table

Notes
 indicates that the housemate was directly nominated for eviction.
 indicates the housemate was immuned from nominations.
 indicates the nominees for the House Captaincy.
 indicates the House Captain.
 indicates the Former House Captain. (House Captain would have been stripped of the captaincy i.e., evicted/ejected/walked out after being nominated as the Captain)
  indicates the Trending Player.
  indicates a new wildcard contestant.
  indicates the contestant is nominated.
 indicates that the contestant has re-entered the house.
 indicates that the contestant walked out of the Bigg Boss house on their own.
  indicates the contestant has been ejected.
  indicates the contestant has been evicted.
  indicates the winner.
  indicates the first runner-up.
  indicates the second runner-up.
  indicates the third runner-up.
  indicates the fourth runner-up.
  indicates the fifth runner-up.

: Suresh despite winning the captaincy task was evicted so he chose Snehan to be the captain in his place.
: For the first time, the "Trending Player" format was introduced in Bigg Boss Tamil. The contestant who is chosen as the "Trending Player" is immune from nominations.
: Suja despite winning the captaincy task was evicted so another captaincy task was held after which Vanitha became the captain.
: Since the housemates weren't playing the luxury budget task properly, Bigg Boss announced that in Week 3 there will be a double eviction.
: On Day 24, Vanitha walked out of the Bigg Boss house due to her conflicts with Niroop and Thamarai. She walked out mainly due to her not wanting to take any risks considering her mental health.
: Sathish upon entry was immuned and Suresh also was immuned upon re-entrance from the nominations.
: Ramya upon entry was immuned from nominations.
: Due to both Abhirami and Balaji M winning the captaincy task, they both became Co-House Captain.
: While Abhirami nominated contestants for eviction, Balaji M saved Suresh after the nominations.
: On Day 52, Suresh walked out due to his health problems worsening.
: On Day 62, Suruthi agreed to take the cash prize of ₹15 lakhs, thus walking out of the show.
: After Suruthi walked out of the show, no eviction took place on Day 63, thus making all six remaining contestants finalists.
: Ex-housemates started entering the house as guests as from Day 65.
: On Day 66, Abhirami was eliminated from the Finale Race and ended as the fifth runner-up based on live voting.
: On Day 67, Juliana was eliminated from the Finale Race''' and ended as the fourth runner-up based on live voting.

Guest Appearance

References

2022 Tamil-language television seasons
2022 Indian television seasons
Kamal Haasan
U 1